Frederick James MacSorley  is a doctor from Northern Ireland who provided medical cover at motorcycle races for more than 20 years. He works as a General Practitioner (GP).

Early life
MacSorley came from a medical family in Belfast.

Medical career
He registered in Belfast in 1978 and has worked as a GP, based in Lurgan since 1992. He also has a role as a BASICS doctor.

In the 2002 he devised a programme of self-defence classes for GPs.

MacSorley was one of the team that pioneered the concept of a mobile response at motorcycle racing events in the mid 1980s. He worked as part of the Motorcycle Union of Ireland's medical team. In September 2014, MacSorley retired from being a “travelling doctor” at motorcycle competitions. He had previously had a well-established partnership with his colleague John Hinds. Hinds died the following year while providing medical cover at a race.

Honours
MacSorley was Northern Ireland Doctor of the Year in 1999. He received a MBE in the 2011 Birthday Honours for services to Healthcare in Northern Ireland.

References

General practitioners from Northern Ireland
21st-century British medical doctors
20th-century British medical doctors
British general practitioners
Fellows of the Royal College of General Practitioners
Members of the Order of the British Empire
Living people
Year of birth missing (living people)